Ryan I. Yamane (born October 24, 1969, in Honolulu, Hawaii) is an American politician and a Democratic member of the Hawaii House of Representatives from November 2004 to January 2023 representing District 37.

Yamane was reelected to a two-year term in the 2022 Hawaiʻi House of Representatives election, but resigned on January 3, 2023 to accept an appointment in Governor Josh Green's cabinet. Gov. Green appointed Trish La Chica to the District 37 seat on February 15, 2023.

Education
Yamane earned his Bachelor of Arts in psychology, his MSW, and his Master of Business Administration from the University of Hawaiʻi.

Elections
2002 Yamane attempted to challenge incumbent Republican Representative Guy Ontai for the District 35 seat, but lost the four-way September 21, 2002 Democratic Primary.
2004 Yamane and Representative Ontai were both unopposed for their September 18, 2004 primaries, setting up a rematch; Yamane won the November 2, 2004 General election against Ontai.
2008 Yamane was unopposed for both the September 20, 2008 Democratic Primary, winning with 4,036 votes, and the November 4, 2008 General election.
2010 Yamane was unopposed for the September 18, 2010 Democratic Primary, winning with 4,493 votes, and won the November 2, 2010 General election with 5,092 votes (54.8%) against Republican nominee Beth Fukumoto.
2012 Yamane was unopposed for the August 11, 2012 Democratic Primary, winning with 5,510 votes, and won the November 6, 2012 General election with 8,660 votes (75.1%) against Republican nominee Emil Svrcina.

Controversy
As Chair of the House Health, Human Services, and Homelessness Committee he was in charge of amending House Bill 1570. A law that would attempt to rein in tobacco products aimed at young children and teens. His critics have stated that the amendments were "posion pill" amendments meant to "Tank the bill and make sure it never passes." Ryan Yamane has said that the amendments and his decisions around the bill were in no way influenced by the thousands he received in donations from big tobacco companies and corporate lobbyists.

References

External links
Official page at the Hawaii State Legislature

1969 births
Living people
21st-century American politicians
Democratic Party members of the Hawaii House of Representatives
Politicians from Honolulu
University of Hawaiʻi at Mānoa alumni
Hawaii politicians of Japanese descent